The Ford Instrument Company was a U.S. corporation known for being the primary supplier of fire control Rangekeepers and analog computers for the United States Navy before and during World War II.

A personal blog, Doug Coward's Analog History Museum, includes a page with details for the Ford Instrument Company Computer Mark I that was used after 1939 on WW II naval guns up to 5 inch and anti-aircraft guns. This page has a background stating that the Ford Instrument Company is a subsidiary of Sperry Rand, indicating that the displayed page was supplied by Sperry while operating as Sperry Rand, 1955 and 1978.

References

Defunct computer companies of the United States
Military computers